Petter Vaagan Moen (born 5 February 1984) is a Norwegian former professional footballer who played as a midfielder for HamKam, Brann, Queens Park Rangers, Lillestrøm and Strømsgodset Toppfotball. Vaagan Moen has 44 national junior caps (16 caps and one goal for Norway's U21 national team which he captained from autumn 2005 until 2006).

Career

HamKam
Vaagan Moen started his career in HamKam and helped the club to promotion to the Tippeliga in 2003. Vaagan Moen's great crosses and free-kicks got him noticed by the big clubs in Norway, and he was though upon as one of the biggest talent in Norwegian football. It was during his spell at HamKam Moen earned the nickname "Mjøsas Beckham" (The Beckham of Mjøsa)

Brann
In 2005, Vaagan Moen signed with SK Brann, a deal worth 10 million NOK (approx £1 million). The winger quickly established himself as a regular on the first team, and was an important contribution to Brann's first league title since 1963. In the 2008 and 2009 season he did not play as good as expected, and many thought he had lost his potential.

In the 2010 season he was positioned as a centre midfielder and he scored 14 goals and was Brann's topscorer and was
select player of the year. Because of his good form he was called up to the Norway national team for the first time since 2007. After the 2010 season he chose not to renew his contract with Brann because of several offers from foreign clubs.

Queens Park Rangers
In December 2010, Queens Park Rangers of the English Championship confirmed that Vaagan Moen had signed a two-and-a-half-year contract with the club and would join on a free transfer on 1 January 2011. He made his début on 3 January, coming on for midfielder Adel Taarabt in the 87th minute. He finished his first season at QPR making eight appearances.

After QPR were promoted to the Premier League, the team brought in new players and it became very difficult for Vaagan Moen to break into the first team. When the new season started and QPR had to reveal their 25-men squad, Vaagan Moen was not involved and had to play reserve games for QPR instead for the rest of the year. He did however score twice for QPR in pre-season; one in a 13–0 win over Tavistock, and one in a 7–0 win against Bodmin Town.

In December 2011, QPR announced their plans to bring in new players and on 30 January 2012 it was confirmed that QPR had cancelled the contract of six players including Vaagan Moen, he therefore became free agent.

Lillestrøm
On 29 February 2012, the Norwegian club Lillestrøm SK announced that they had signed a three-year contract with Vaagan Moen. He wore shirt number 10.

Strømsgodset
On 27 January 2015, Vaagan Moen signed a three-year contract for Strømsgodset Toppfotball on a free transfer.

Career statistics

International goals
Scores and results list Norway's goal tally first, score column indicates score after Moen goal.

Honours
Brann
Norwegian Premier League: 2007

Queens Park Rangers
Football League Championship: 2010–11

References

External links
 

1984 births
Living people
Sportspeople from Hamar
Norwegian footballers
Norway international footballers
Hamarkameratene players
SK Brann players
Queens Park Rangers F.C. players
Lillestrøm SK players
Eliteserien players
Norwegian First Division players
Norwegian Second Division players
English Football League players
Norwegian expatriate footballers
Expatriate footballers in England
Norwegian expatriate sportspeople in England
Association football midfielders